Mountain Branch is a  long 1st order tributary to Aarons Creek in Halifax County, Virginia.

Course 
Mountain Branch rises in a pond about 3 miles northeast of Virgilina, Virginia, and then flows east to join Aarons Creek about 1.5 miles west of Nelson.

Watershed 
Mountain Branch drains  of area, receives about 45.5 in/year of precipitation, has a wetness index of 354.52, and is about 40% forested.

See also 
 List of Virginia Rivers

References 

Rivers of Virginia
Rivers of Halifax County, Virginia
Tributaries of the Roanoke River